Maroua Chebbi (born 30 December 1986) is a Tunisian footballer who plays as a midfielder. She has been a member of the Tunisia women's national team.

Club career
Chebbi has played for Tunis Air Club in Tunisia and for Quebec City Amiral SC and Laval Rouge et Or in Canada.

International goals
Scores and results list Tunisia goal tally first

See also
List of Tunisia women's international footballers

References

External links
 Simon Baillargeon, « Chebbi monte à bord du navire », Le Journal de Québec, 7 juin 2009 
 Le Rouge et Or official website 

1986 births
Living people
Footballers from Tunis
Tunisian women's footballers
Women's association football midfielders
Laval Rouge et Or athletes
Tunisia women's international footballers
Tunisian expatriate footballers
Tunisian expatriates in Canada
Expatriate women's soccer players in Canada
20th-century Tunisian women
21st-century Tunisian women